Helga Henning (11 November 1937 – 11 December 2018) was a German sprinter. She competed in the women's 400 metres at the 1968 Summer Olympics representing West Germany.

References

External links
 

1937 births
2018 deaths
Athletes (track and field) at the 1968 Summer Olympics
German female sprinters
Olympic athletes of West Germany
People from Hanover Region
Olympic female sprinters
Sportspeople from Lower Saxony
20th-century German women